Latum may refer to:
Latum, Iran, a village in Gilan Province, Iran
the marine parasite Diphyllobothrium latum
Ligamentum latum, the Broad ligament of the uterus